Stewart Smith (12 April 1855 – 29 November 1896) was a Scotland international rugby union player. He played as a forward.

Rugby Union career

Amateur career

Smith played for Glasgow Academicals.

Provincial career

Smith was called up for the Glasgow District side for the 1877 provincial match against Edinburgh District on 1 December 1877 while still with Glasgow Academicals.

Smith played for Blues Trial in their match against Whites Trial on 16 February 1878.

Smith played for West of Scotland District in their match against East of Scotland District on 1 March 1879.

International career

Smith was called up to the Scotland squad in 1877 and played Ireland at Belfast on 19 February. He was also called up the following year for the England match at Raeburn Place, Edinburgh on 4 March 1878.

References

1855 births
1896 deaths
Rugby union players from Glasgow
Scottish rugby union players
Scotland international rugby union players
History of rugby union in Scotland
Glasgow District (rugby union) players
Glasgow Academicals rugby union players
Blues Trial players
West of Scotland District (rugby union) players
Rugby union forwards